Macrosoma pectinogyna is a moth-like butterfly in the family Hedylidae. It was described by Malcolm J. Scoble in 1990.

References

Hedylidae
Butterflies described in 1990